Mirjam Jacobson (14 July 1887 – 8 February 1945) was a Dutch painter.

Biography 
Jacobson was born on 14 July 1887 in Amsterdam. Her teachers included , Johannes Hendricus Jurres, Simon Maris, and Hendrik Jan Wolter.

In 1919 she exhibited her work at the Jaarbeurs voor kunstnijverheid (Trade fair for arts and crafts). In 1932 she married Izzac Cohen Bendiks. Jacobson's work was included in the 1939 exhibition and sale Onze Kunst van Heden (Our Art of Today) at the Rijksmuseum in Amsterdam.

Jacobson and her husband were imprisoned at Bergen-Belsen concentration camp. Both she and her husband died there before they were able to immigrate to Honduras. Jacobson died on 8 February 1945 at the age of 57.

References

External links 

1887 births
1945 deaths
Painters from Amsterdam
20th-century Dutch women artists
Dutch painters
Dutch people who died in Bergen-Belsen concentration camp
Dutch Jews who died in the Holocaust
Dutch women painters
20th-century Dutch painters